Youssifou Atté (born 16 May 1996) is a Togolese footballer who currently plays as a defender for Linafoot side TP Mazembe.

Career 
Atté started his career with West African Football Academy, he was promoted to the senior team in December 2017. He made debut on 17 March 2018, after playing the full 90 minutes in a 1–1 draw to Asante Kotoko. He played 14 league matches in his debut season, before the league was cancelled due to the controversies around the Anas Number 12 Expose. During the 2019 GFA Normalization Competition, he made 12 appearances. He continued to be the first choice right-back and relevant member of the team during the truncated 2019–20 season as he played all 15 league matches before the league was cut short due to the COVID-19 pandemic in Ghana.

International career 
In March 2020, he was handed his maiden call up into the Togo national team by Claude Le Roy after consistent performances for WAFA. The call up was ahead AFCON 2021 double header qualifier matches against Egypt. He made senior debut on 29 March 2021, after coming on at half time for Yendoutié Nane in an AFCON 2021 qualifier against Kenya. The match ended in a 2–1 loss.

Career statistics

International

References

External links 

 TP Mazembe Profile

Living people
1996 births
Association football defenders
Togolese footballers
West African Football Academy players
Ghana Premier League players
Togolese expatriate footballers
Togolese expatriate sportspeople in Ghana
Togo international footballers
21st-century Togolese people